This is a list of notable events in music that took place in the year 1985.

Specific locations
1985 in British music
1985 in Norwegian music

Specific genres
1985 in country music
1985 in heavy metal music
1985 in hip hop music
1985 in jazz

Events

January–March
January 1 – The newest music video channel, VH-1, begins broadcasting on American cable. It is aimed at an older demographic than its sister station, MTV. The first video played is Marvin Gaye's rendition of "The Star-Spangled Banner".
January 11
One of the biggest music festivals in the world begins in Rio de Janeiro, Brazil, the Rock in Rio, had a public of 1.5 million people at all, including Iron Maiden, Nina Hagen, The B52's, Go Go's, Queen, Rod Stewart, James Taylor, AC/DC, and many more. National artists such as Gilberto Gil, Elba Ramalho, Barão Vermelho and Paralamas do Sucesso also perform.
Willie Dixon sues Led Zeppelin over the song "Whole Lotta Love", on the grounds that it contains too many similarities to his own song "You Need Love". The lawsuit is settled out of court.
January 28 – Various artists, under the group name USA For Africa, including Ray Charles, Bob Dylan, Michael Jackson, Billy Joel, Cyndi Lauper, Steve Perry, Kenny Loggins, Willie Nelson, Lionel Richie, Smokey Robinson, Kenny Rogers, Diana Ross, Paul Simon, Bruce Springsteen, Huey Lewis, Tina Turner, Sheila E., Harry Belafonte, Amy "Sunflower" Johnson, Lindsey Buckingham, Kim Carnes, Dionne Warwick, Waylon Jennings, Bob Geldof and Stevie Wonder, record the song "We Are the World", written by Jackson and Ritchie.
February – Just months after the compact disc release of his sixteenth and most recent studio album, Tonight, and nearly two years after the initial CD release of its predecessor, Let's Dance, RCA Records reissues David Bowie's previous fourteen studio albums plus four greatest hits albums on the format. Consequently, Bowie becomes the first major artist to have his entire catalog converted to CD.
February 14
Whitney Houston releases her debut album.
February 22
The "One Night with Blue Note" concert, celebrating the relaunch of Blue Note Records and featuring over 30 jazz greats, is held at The Town Hall in New York. Freddie Hubbard, Herbie Hancock, Jack DeJohnette, McCoy Tyner and Grover Washington, Jr. are just a few of the performers.
February 26 – The 27th Annual Grammy Awards are presented in Los Angeles, hosted by John Denver. Lionel Richie's Can't Slow Down wins Album of the Year, while Tina Turner's "What's Love Got to Do with It" wins both Record of the Year and Song of the Year. Cyndi Lauper wins Best New Artist.
March 9 – Tears for Fears album Songs from the Big Chair debuts at number two on the UK Albums Chart. Enjoying massive sales, it spends 29 consecutive weeks on the top 10 and remain on the chart for another 50 weeks until September 1986.
March 27 – The South African Broadcasting Corporation bans Stevie Wonder's music in response to Wonder dedicating the Oscar he had won the night before to Nelson Mandela.
March 28 – A wax likeness of Michael Jackson is unveiled at Madame Tussaud's in London, UK.

April–June
April 1 – After months of squabbling, David Lee Roth leaves Van Halen to begin a solo career.
April 7 – Wham! becomes the first Western pop group to perform in China when they play a concert in Beijing's Workers Stadium during an historic 10-day visit.
April 10 – Madonna begins her very first tour, The Virgin Tour (named after her Like a Virgin album) in Seattle, Washington, USA.
April 20 – Tears for Fears single "Everybody Wants to Rule the World" becomes their highest-charting single in the UK as it reach number two on the singles chart, held off the top position for two consecutive weeks by "We are the World".
May – Russian singer Valery Leontiev starts his 10-date tour "Alone with all" and it becomes an instant hit. Queues for tickets blocked the traffic on a few central streets of Leningrad.
May 4 – With "La det swinge" by Bobbysocks!, Norway scores its first win at the Eurovision Song Contest, in Gothenburg, Sweden.
May 13 – Dire Straits release their fifth studio album, Brothers in Arms. The album becomes highly successful in part because of its unusually high sound quality, the result of it being recorded entirely digitally as opposed to with standard analog magnetic tape. The album additionally serves as a killer app for the compact disc format, becoming the first album to sell more copies on CD than on phonograph record, and goes on to become the highest selling album of the 1980s in the UK.
June 11 – Madonna ends The Virgin Tour at Madison Square Garden in New York, USA.

July–September
July 13 – The Live Aid concert takes place in Wembley Stadium, London, UK, and JFK Stadium in Philadelphia, USA. The headlining acts at the latter venue included a Led Zeppelin reunion, the first since their 1980 disbandment. The former venue, however, becomes the more notable of the two over the years, in part due to the high acclaim of Queen's performance of "Radio Ga Ga", which serves as the band's comeback in the United Kingdom (Queen would still remain a pariah in the United States in the wake of Hot Space until after Freddie Mercury's death six years later). With a little help from the British Concorde jet, singer Phil Collins manages to perform at both venues. This would be the last time Duran Duran would perform together with the original line up until they reunited to record their 2004 album Astronaut. On this day they would also have the number 1 song on the US Billboard charts with their James Bond theme to the film A View to a Kill.
September 6 – Michael Jackson purchases the publishing rights for most of the Beatles' music for $47 million, much to the dismay of Paul McCartney, against whom he is bidding.
September 19 – The Parents Music Resource Center's (P.M.R.C.) United States Senate hearing on rock censorship begin in Washington, D.C. Heavy metal singer Dee Snider of Twisted Sister, rock star Frank Zappa and country singer John Denver testify against the P.M.R.C.
September 22 
The Farm Aid concert is held in Champaign, Illinois, USA.
Massimo Bogianckino, general manager of the Paris Opera and former head of both the Maggio Musicale Fiorentino and La Scala, is elected mayor of Florence.

October–December
October 26 – "Saving All My Love for You" by Whitney Houston tops the Billboard Hot 100. It was her first of 7 consecutive number-one singles through 1988.
December 5 – The first fully digital reggae single, Wayne Smith's "(Under Me) Sleng Teng", is recorded at Prince Jammy's studio; it is the beginning of ragga style reggae.
December 23 – Two young fans of Judas Priest in Sparks, Nevada shoot themselves, one fatally, after listening to the band's records. A lawsuit is brought against the group in 1986 claiming that they were compelled by backwards subliminal messages hidden in their music.
December 31 – The fourteenth annual New Year's Rockin' Eve special is aired on ABC television, with appearances by Four Tops, The Judds, Barry Manilow, The Motels, Tears for Fears and The Temptations.

Also in 1985
Several hundreds of thousands of US dollars in publishing royalties are released to the surviving members, and families of the deceased members, of the British music group, Badfinger. Two band members, Pete Ham and Tom Evans, previously committed suicide due to financial problems.
Metal Edge magazine is launched.
Roger Waters announces his intention to leave Pink Floyd; describing the band as "a spent force creatively," he would spend the next two years in a legal battle with his now-former bandmates over the rights to the "Pink Floyd" name and other associated assets.

Bands formed
See Musical groups established in 1985

Bands disbanded
See Musical groups disestablished in 1985

Albums released

January–March

April–June

July–September

October–December

Release date unknown

2WO – Strange Advance
7 Day Weekend – The Comsat Angels
Alan Merrill – Alan Merrill
Alternating Currents – Spyro GyraAncient Artifacts – D.I.Another Place – HiroshimaAnother World – The RochesBaggariddim – UB40 Back in the DHSS – Half Man Half BiscuitBeat Happening – Beat HappeningBeat the System – PetraBehaviour – Saga Begegnungen II – Eno Moebius Roedelius PlankBelieve You Me – BlancmangeThe Best of Elvy Sukaeish – Elvy SukaesihBetween Heaven 'n Hell – Resurrection BandThe Big Prize – Honeymoon SuiteBites – Skinny PuppyBo Diddley & Co. – Live – Bo DiddleyBranded and Exiled – Running WildChange No Change – Elliot EastonChristmas Time – Chris StameyColor of Success – Morris DayCommander Sozo and the Charge of the Light Brigade – DeGarmo and KeyCompany of Justice – Play DeadCopacabana: The Original Motion Picture Soundtrack Album – Barry ManilowCuori agitati – Eros RamazzottiA Diamond Hidden in the Mouth of a Corpse – Giorno Poetry SystemsDinosaur – Dinosaur Jr. Do You – Sheena Easton Downtown – Marshall CrenshawDream Come True – A Flock of SeagullsEvery Turn of the World – Christopher CrossFalse Accusations – The Robert Cray BandFantastic Something – Fantastic SomethingFear and Whiskey – MekonsFlame – Real Life
Flaunt the Imperfection – China Crisis
Feargal Sharkey – Feargal Sharkey (solo debut)
For the Working Class Man – Jimmy Barnes
Forever Running – B-Movie
Futile Combat – Skeletal Family
Go West – Go West 
The Goonies: Original Motion Picture Soundtrack – Various Artists 
Have Yourself Committed – Bryan Duncan
The Heart of the Matter – Kenny Rogers 
Hero – Clarence Clemons
The History Mix Volume 1 – Godley & Creme
Hotline – White Heart
I Am the Night – Pantera 
I Don't Want to Grow Up – Descendents
In the House – Images in Vogue
Into the Fire Live – Play Dead
Just Like Real Life – Prodigal
Kingdom in the Streets – Dion DiMucci
Life – Gladys Knight & the Pips
Little Baggariddim EP  – UB40

Live in Carré – The Dubliners
Looking at You – Chaz Jankel
Love Beyond Reason – Randy Stonehill
Love Hurts – Elaine Paige
Machine Age Voodoo – SPK
Manilow – Barry Manilow
Mental Notes – Bad Manners
Mayhem – Toyah (compilation)
Minx – Toyah Willcox (solo debut)
Mistral gagnant – Renaud 
Mud Will Be Flung Tonight – Bette Midler 
Mystery – RAH Band
The Night We Flew Out The Window – Fantastic SomethingNo Muss...No Fuss – Donnie IrisNow – The Christmas Album – Various Artists Off the Board – LudichristOil & Gold – ShriekbackOld Flame – Juice NewtonOld Land – Cluster & Brian EnoOn the Fritz – Steve TaylorOne for the Road – April WineOnly Four You – Mary Jane GirlsOpen Fire – Y&TPartners, Brothers and Friends – Nitty Gritty Dirt BandPromesas – José JoséRescue You – Joe Lynn TurnerResistance – Burning SpearRomance – David CassidySay You Love Me – Jennifer HollidayA Secret Wish – PropagandaA Sense of Wonder – Van Morrison Shamrock Diaries – Chris ReaSkin Dive – Michael Franks
So Many Rivers – Bobby Womack
Some of My Best Jokes Are Friends – George Clinton 
Some People – Belouis Some
Stages – Triumph
Stay Hard – Raven 
Steady Nerves – Graham Parker and The Shot
Syirin Farthat – Elvy Sukaesih
Talk about the Weather – Red Lorry Yellow Lorry
Telephone Free Landslide Victory – Camper Van Beethoven
Through a Window – Patrick Sky
Thursday Afternoon – Brian Eno
The UB40 File – UB40
Under Lock and Key – Dokken
U.T.F.O. – UTFO
Vassar Clements, John Hartford, Dave Holland – Vassar Clements, John Hartford, Dave Holland
Voices Carry – 'Til Tuesday 
What a Life! – Divinyls
Whatever Happened to Jugula? – Roy HarperWithout Love – Black N' BlueWonderful – Circle JerksZaman – Ebiet G. Ade

Biggest hit singles
The following songs achieved the highest in the charts of 1985.

Top 40 Chart hit singles

Other Chart hit singles

Notable singles

Other Notable singles

Classical music
John AdamsThe Chairman DancesHarmonielehreKalevi Aho
Oboe SonataSolo II, for piano
Pierre BoulezDialogue de l'ombre double for clarinet and electronicsMemoriale (… explosante fixe… Originel) for flute and ensemble
Mario Davidovsky – Capriccio for two pianos
Peter Maxwell Davies – An Orkney Wedding, with SunriseJames Dillon – Windows and Canopies, small orchestra (20 players)
Henri Dutilleux – L'arbre des Songes (violin concerto)
Roland Dyens – Tango en Skaï, for guitar
Morton FeldmanCoptic Light, for orchestraFor Bunita Marcus, for pianoViolin and String QuartetPiano and String QuartetBrian Ferneyhough – Etudes Transcendantales for soprano and chamber ensemble
Lorenzo FerreroCanzoni d'amore (song cycle)Empty StageMy RockBeat Furrer – String Quartet No. 1
Karel GoeyvaertsPas à pas, for solo pianoLes Voix de Verseau, for soprano, flute, clarinet, violin, cello, and piano
Henryk GóreckiO Domina Nostra, Op. 55, soprano and organFive Marian Songs, Op. 54, chorus a cappella
Gérard Grisey – Les espaces acoustiques – VI – Epilogue, for 4 solo horns and large orchestra
Jacques Hétu – Missa pro trecentisimo annoHans Werner Henze – Selbst- und ZwiegesprächeHeinz Holliger – Präludium, Arioso and Passacaglia, for two guitars
Nicholas Jackson – Organ Sonata
Tristan Keuris
String Quartet No. 2
Variations for Strings
Aria for flute and piano
György Ligeti – Études pour piano, Book 1, six etudes
Andrew Lloyd Webber – Requiem
Witold Lutosławski – Chain 2 for violin and orchestra
Tristan Murail – Time and Again, for orchestra
Arvo Pärt – Stabat Mater for 3 voices and string trio
John Rutter – Requiem
Giacinto Scelsi – String Quartet No. 5
Alfred Schnittke
Concerto for mixed chorus
Concerto Grosso No. 3 for two violins, harpsichord, celesta, piano and 14 strings
String Trio
Concerto for viola and orchestra
Salvatore SciarrinoAllegoria della notte, symphonic workCanzona di ringraziamento Lo spazio inverso 
Isabel Soveral – FragmentosKarlheinz Stockhausen – Ave, for basset horn and alto flute
Tōru Takemitsu – Dream/Window, for orchestra
Joan Tower – Piano Concerto
Manfred Trojahn
Requiem
Symphony No. 3
Erkki-Sven Tüür – String Quartet "In memoriam Urmas Kibuspuu"Robert Ward – Raleigh DivertimentoOpera
Dominick Argento – Casanova's HomecomingLorenzo FerreroMare nostroNightPhilip Glass and Robert Moran – The Juniper TreeHans Werner Henze – The English Cat (first English language production)
Dorothy Rudd Moore – Frederick DouglassSalvatore Sciarrino – La perfezione di uno spirito sottileBallet
Lorenzo FerreroLotus Eaters The MiracleJazz

Musical theater
 Big River – Broadway production opened at the Eugene O'Neill Theatre and ran for 1005 performances
 Dames at Sea – off Broadway revival
 The King and I (Rodgers & Hammerstein) – Broadway revival
 Leader of the Pack – Broadway production opened at the Ambassador Theatre and ran for 120 performances
 Me and My Girl (Noel Gay) – London revival
 Les Misérables – London production opened in October and has been continuously running since, making it the longest running musical in West End history
 The Mystery of Edwin Drood – Broadway production opened at the Imperial Theatre and ran for 108 performances
 Seven Brides for Seven Brothers (Saul Chaplin, Gene de Paul and Johnny Mercer) – London production
 Singin' in the Rain – Broadway production (based on 1952 film of the same name)
 Song and Dance – Broadway production opened at the Royale Theatre and ran for 474 performances

Musical films
 A Chorus Line Alag Alag 
 Donga Hum Dono Kathodu Kathoram Krush Groove Naná Rappin' That's Dancing!Births
January 2 – Luis Beza, American trumpet player (Suburban Legends)
January 3 – Justin Paul, American singer, composer and lyricist (Pasek and Paul )
January 6 – Amalie Bruun, Danish multi instrumentalist, singer and actress. 
January 8 – Rachael Lampa,  American contemporary Christian singer, songwriter and record producer. 
January 16 – Gintaras Janusevicius, Lithuanian classical pianist
January 18 – Simone Simons, Dutch symphonic metal singer/songwriter
January 22 – Orianthi, Australian musician, singer and songwriter 
January 28 
 András Kállay-Saunders, Hungarian-born American recording artist, songwriter and record producer
 J. Cole, German-American hip hop recording artist and record producer
January 29 – Mikey Hachey, American bass player 
 Giovanna Fletcher, British author, stage actress, singer, and internet personality  (wife of Tom Fletcher of Mcfly, sister in law of Carrie Hope Fletcher)
January 31 – Kalomira, American-Greek singer
February 1 – Shellback (record producer), Swedish record producer, songwriter and multi-instrumentalist
February 5 – Lindsey Cardinale, American singer
February 8 – Jeremy Davis, American bass player and songwriter (Paramore)
February 11 – William Beckett, American singer-songwriter and guitarist (The Academy Is...)
February 14 – Havana Brown (musician),  Australian DJ, recording artist, record producer and dancer
February 17 – Anne Curtis, Filipina actress, recording artist, entertainer, sister of Jasmine Curtis-Smith, and married to Erwan Heussaff, brother of Solenn Heussaff
February 19 – Haylie Duff, American actress, singer-songwriter, television host, writer and fashion designer (sister of Hilary Duff) 
February 20 – Yulia Volkova, Russian singer, (t.A.T.u.)
February 27 - Heléne Yorke, Canadian-American actress, writer, singer, and dancer. 
February 28 – Fefe Dobson, Canadian songwriter
March 4 – Scott Michael Foster, American actor and singer (Crazy Ex Girlfriend) 
March 8 – Ewa Sonnet, Polish model and singer
March 12 – Stromae,  Belgian musician, rapper, singer and songwriter
March 29 
 Mirusia Louwerse, Dutch-Australian lyric soprano
 Emil Nava, British music video director 
April 3 – Leona Lewis,   British singer, songwriter, actress, model and activist.
April 9
 Tim Bendzko, German singer-songwriter
 Tomohisa Yamashita, Japanese singer and actor
April 13 – Ty Dolla Sign, American singer, songwriter, rapper and record producer.
April 20 – Jadyn Douglas, Puerto Rican-American singer-songwriter and actress
April 24 – Courtnee Draper, American actress and singer 
April 25 – Morgan Evans (singer), Australian country music singer and songwriter (Kelsea Ballerini) 
May 2 – Lily Allen, English singer-songwriter
May 4 – 
Jidenna, Nigerian-American rapper, singer-songwriter and record producer
 Jme (musician),  British grime MC, songwriter, record producer and DJ 
May 7 – J Balvin,  Colombian reggaeton singer 
May 10 – Ashley Poole, American singer (Dream)
May 11 – Matt Giraud, American singer-songwriter and pianist
May 17 – Derek Hough, American Latin and ballroom dancer, choreographer, actor and singer
May 18 – Francesca Battistelli, American singer, CCM
May 22 – Vangie Tang, Hong Kong singer
 May 28 
 Colbie Caillat, American singer/songwriter/musician
 Carey Mulligan, English actress and singer 
May 30 – Katie Stelmanis, Canadian musician and producer 
June 2 – Ana Cristina, American singer-songwriter, dancer and actress
June 9 – Benj Pasek, American singer-songwriter and composer (Pasek and Paul) 
June 15 – Nadine Coyle, Irish pop singer-songwriter, actress and model (Girls Aloud)
June 17 – Andrea Demirović, Montenegrin pop singer
June 20 – Caroline Polachek, American musician, singer-songwriter, activist and record producer known as the vocalist for Chairlift 
June 21 – Lana Del Rey, American singer-songwriter, director, model, poet and activist 
June 22 – Scott MacIntyre, American singer-songwriter and pianist
June 23 – Kavka Shishido, Japanese drummer and vocalist
June 24 – Aste, Finnish rapper
June 30 
 K.Flay, born Kristine Flaherty, American singer-songwriter and rapper 
 Hugh Sheridan, Australian actor, singer, musician and television presenter
July 2 
 Ashley Tisdale, American singer, actress, producer, songwriter and YouTuber (High School Musical, Phineas and Ferb, Vanessa Hudgens)  
 Zach Dawes, American musician, producer, engineer, and technician (Frequently works with: Lana Del Rey, Sharon Van Etten) 
 July 4
 Mariana Rios, Brazilian actress and singer
 Lartiste, Moroccan-French singer and rapper
July 5 – Alle Farben, German DJ and producer
July 6
Diamond Rings, Canadian singer-songwriter, guitarist and producer (Matters)
D. Woods, American singer, dancer and actress (Danity Kane)
July 9 – Hee Ah Lee, South Korean handicapped pianist
July 10 – Emily King, American singer-songwriter
July 11 – Tobias Jesso Jr., Canadian musician (married to Emma Louise) 
July 12 – Luiz Ejlli, Albanian singer
July 15 – Nathaniel Willemse, South African-born Australian singer and songwriter 
July 17 
 Tom Fletcher British singer/songwriter/musician (member of McFLY, brother of Carrie Hope Fletcher)
 Taylor Goldsmith,  American singer-songwriter and guitarist, (lead singer and chief songwriter of the American folk rock band Dawes) (Mandy Moore) 
July 18 – Hopsin, American rapper, producer and actor
July 19 – Amy Pearson, English singer-songwriter
July 20 – Solenn Heussaff, Filipina singer, entertainer, and sister-in-law of Anne Curtis
July 24 - Grace Petrie, English folk singer-songwriter and guitarist 
July 31 
 Alissa White-Gluz, Canadian singer-songwriter (The Agonist, Arch Enemy)  
 Allie X, Canadian singer-songwriter 
August 1 – Dina, Norwegian singer
August 2 – Britt Nicole,  American vocalist, songwriter and recording artist. 
August 3
Holly Blake-Arnstein, American singer (Dream)
Brent Kutzle (OneRepublic) American Musician 
August 4 – Kina Grannis, American singer-songwriter, guitarist and YouTuber. 
August 5 – Annalisa, Italian singer-songwriter and musician
August 9 – Anna Kendrick, American actress/singer
August 11 – Asher Roth, American Rapper
August 13 – Lacey Brown, American singer-songwriter
August 15
 Nipsey Hussle, American rapper, singer and businessman (d. 2019) 
 Emily Kinney, American actress, singer, and songwriter
August 16 
 Cristin Milioti, American actress, singer and musician 
 Taylor Goldsmith, American singer-songwriter, guitarist, and record producer (Member of band Dawes, Husband and musical collaborator of Mandy Moore) 
 Arden Cho, Amrican actress, singer and model
August 19 – Christina Perri, American singer/songwriter/musician
August 25 – Andien, Indonesian jazz singer
August 29 – Achilles Liarmakopoulos, Greek trombonist (Canadian Brass)
August 31 - Sarah Jones, English musician and drummer
September 4 – Sukrit Wisetkaew, Thai actor and singer 
September 23 – Diana Ortiz, American singer (Dream)
September 26 – M. Pokora, French pop, crunk, R&B singer and musician  (Christina Millian) 
September 28 – Alina Ibragimova, Russian British violinist
October 1  – Porcelain Black, American industrial indie pop singer-songwriter
October 2 – Vogue Williams, Irish DJ, radio host, model and dancer 
October 5 – Nicola Roberts, English recording artist, fashion designer and songwriter
October 8 
 Bruno Mars, American singer-songwriter and dancer
 Elliphant, Swedish singer-songwriter and rapper
October 10 – MARINA, Welsh singer/songwriter
October 22 – Zac Hanson, American singer-songwriter (Hanson)
October 23 
 Miguel, American singer-songwriter, producer
 Lachlan Gillespie, Australian singer, musician, and actor. He is a member of the Wiggles and wears the purple skivvy.  (Emma Watkins, Dana Stephensen) 
October 25 
 Ciara, American singer, actress and dancer
 Ayahi Takagaki, Japanese voice actress and singer  
 Vlad Topalov, Russian singer and dancer 
October 26 – Soko (singer), French singer-songwriter, musician and actress.
October 28 – Tina Guo, Chinese-American cellist and erhuist
November 4 – Vanessa Struhler,  German singer-songwriter 
November 5 – Kate DeAraugo, Australian singer-songwriter, Australian Idol 3 winner
November 15 – Nick Fradiani, American singer
November 19 – Ricki-Lee Coulter, New Zealand-born Australian singer-songwriter, Australian Idol'' contestant
November 21 – 
 Carly Rae Jepsen, Canadian singer, songwriter and musician
 Ruelle, American EDM pop singer/songwriter
November 22 – Austin Brown, American producer, singer, songwriter and musician
November 23 – Troy Ave, American rapper
December 1 – Janelle Monae, American recording artist, record producer, singer-songwriter, model, actor, businesswomen and activist
 December 3 – Amanda Seyfried, American singer, musical star, actor
 December 10
 Raven-Symoné, American actress and singer
Grace Chatto, English musician and singer, member of Clean Bandit
December 12 – Erika Van Pelt, American singer
December 22 – Kae Tempest, English poet, spoken-word artist, rapper and playwright
December 23 – Dev Hynes, British singer, songwriter, composer, producer and author
December 23 – Harry Judd, British pop drummer (McFly) 
December 29 – Alexa Ray Joel, American singer-songwriter and pianist
 Undated:
 RAC (musician), a Portland-based Portuguese-American musician and record producer and  businessman
 Dana Stephensen:  Australian ballet dancer. She is a soloist of The Australian Ballet.

Deaths
January 3 – Lucien Cailliet, clarinetist, conductor, arranger and composer, 87
January 4 – Lovro von Matačić, Croatian conductor, 85
January 10 – Anton Karas, Austrian zither player and composer, 78
January 25 – Paul Smith, American film and television composer, 78
January 30 – Ivar Haglund, folk singer and restaurateur, 79 (heart attack)
February 7 – Matt Monro, English singer, 54 (liver cancer)
February 11 – Heinz Eric Roemheld, American composer, 83
February 12 – Leslie Sarony, English singer, comedian and songwriter, 87
February 18
Willy Alberti, Dutch singer, 58 (liver cancer)
Gábor Darvas, composer and musicologist, 74
February 22 – Delores Marie "D'Marie" Warren, founding member of Alton McClain & Destiny, 32 (car crash)
Efrem Zimbalist, violinist, 94
February 28 – David Byron, vocalist of Uriah Heep, 38 (alcohol-related)
March 1 – Eugene List, American classical pianist, 66
March 16 – Roger Sessions, American composer, 88
March 23 – Zoot Sims, jazz saxophonist, 59
March 31 – Jeanine Deckers, known as The Singing Nun, 51 (suicide)
May 2 
Bridget D'Oyly Carte, opera impresario, 77
Leonard Falcone, baritone/euphonium virtuosos and director of bands at Michigan State, 86
May 8 – Karl Marx, composer and conductor, 87
May 12 – Rodolfo Arizaga, Argentinian composer
May 19 – Hilding Rosenberg, composer, 92
July 23 – Kay Kyser, US bandleader, 80
July 30 – Peter Knight, conductor, arranger and composer, 68
August 11 – Nick Ceroli, jazz drummer, 45
August 12 – Kyu Sakamoto, Japanese singer, 43 (plane crash)
August 24 – Paul Creston, American composer, 78
September 6 – Little Brother Montgomery, jazz and blues pianist and singer, 79
September 8 – Frederick May, Irish composer, 74
September 11 – William Alwyn, English composer, 79
September 18 – Ed Lewis, jazz trumpeter, 76
September 19 – Rockdrigo González, folk & rock singer-songwriter, 34 (1985 Mexico City earthquake)
October 6
Lola Gjoka, Albanian pianist, 75
Nelson Riddle, US conductor, composer and arranger, 64
October 11 – Tex Williams, US country singer, 68
October 12 – Ricky Wilson, guitarist (The B-52's), 32 (AIDS Related) 
October 14 – Emil Gilels, pianist, 68
October 18 – Stefan Askenase, pianist, 94
October 20 – Boris Lisanevich, dancer, 80
October 22 – Viorica Ursuleac, operatic soprano, 91
November 15 – Seán Ryan, Irish fiddler and whistler
November 18 – Stephan Henrik Barratt-Due, Norwegian violinist and music teacher, 66
November 24 – Big Joe Turner, blues singer, 74
December 12 – Ian Stewart (The Rolling Stones), 42 (heart attack)
December 22 – D. Boon, lead singer of Minutemen, 27 (car accident)
December 30 – Bob Pearson, pianist and singer (Bob and Alf Pearson), 78
December 31 – Ricky Nelson, singer, former teen idol, 45 (plane crash)

Awards
Eurovision Song Contest 1985
27th Annual Grammy Awards
1985 Country Music Association Awards
27th Japan Record Awards

Charts

Billboard (USA)

US Top 100 Hits of 1985

See also
 Record labels established in 1985

References

 
20th century in music
Music by year